Radošovice is a municipality and village in Benešov District in the Central Bohemian Region of the Czech Republic. It has about 400 inhabitants.

Administrative parts
Villages of Lipiny u Radošovic and Onšovice are administrative parts of Radošovice.

References

Villages in Benešov District